The Mikoyan-Gurevich I-270 (Design Ж ("Zh") under Mikoyan-Gurevich's in-house designation sequence, USAF/DoD designation: Type 11) was a response to a Soviet Air Forces requirement in 1945 for a rocket-powered interceptor aircraft for the point-defence role. In concept and basic configuration, it was related to the early Korolyov RP-318 rocket-powered aircraft which was developed in 1936 and first flew February 20, 1940, and the more recent Bereznyak-Isayev BI-1 Soviet design. Only two prototypes were built, both of which were destroyed in crashes, leading to the cancellation of the project.

Flights

In the early stages of World War II (1942), a complete prototype BI-1 (also known as The Devil's Broomstick), made its first several flights. The I-270 shared the BI-1's simple, tapered fuselage, bubble canopy, wing design, and dual-chambered bipropellant rocket motor. On the other hand, it was considerably larger than the BI-1 and featured short, reinforced wings (from the RP-218) and a raised T-tail which aircraft such as the Tupolev ANT-8 proved, offered better landing control than the BI-1's more traditional fighter layout. While there seems little doubt that the BI-1 influenced the design of the I-270, the latter appears far from a direct descendant of the former, and much closer to being a Soviet version of the Me 263, sharing very similar fuselage, canopy and landing gear layouts, while adding a conventional stabilizer surface atop the vertical tail, absent on the German design.

Soviet tradition of rocketry, starting from the early work of Konstantin Tsiolkovsky and carried through by men like Sergei Korolev, made rocket fighters a reality.  The RD-2M engine, designed by Leonid Dushkin was the dual-combustion chamber version of the engine used for the 1941 BI-1 rocket plane. That in turn had followed from a tradition dating back to Sergey Korolev's work on project "06" in the early 1930s and the RP-318 rocket plane designed in 1936.

The first gliding trials commenced in December 1946, with the first prototype towed into the air behind a Tupolev Tu-2, ballast-loaded in place of an engine. The second prototype began powered tests early in 1947, but was damaged beyond repair making a hard landing. Shortly afterwards, the first prototype was also destroyed in a landing accident. By this stage, turbojet technology was at a far more advanced stage than it had been at the outset of the project, and surface-to-air missiles had replaced the need for point-defence interceptors. Under these circumstances, the Air Force decided to cancel the project.

Operators

Soviet Air Forces

Specifications (I-270)

See also

References

I-270
1940s Soviet fighter aircraft
Rocket-powered aircraft
Abandoned military aircraft projects of the Soviet Union
Aircraft first flown in 1946
T-tail aircraft